Louisburgh may refer to:

 Louisburgh, County Mayo, Ireland
 Louisburgh, Wick, Caithness, Scotland

See also
Louisburg (disambiguation)
Lewisburg (disambiguation)